Franck Perrot (born 7 February 1972) is a French biathlete. He competed in the men's 20 km individual event at the 1994 Winter Olympics.

References

External links
 

1972 births
Living people
French male biathletes
Olympic biathletes of France
Biathletes at the 1994 Winter Olympics
Sportspeople from Savoie